Eye for an Eye is a 2008 South Korean film.

Plot 
Veteran police detective Baek Seong-chan is on the verge of retiring to set up his own business. But he is forced to put his plans on hold when ₩1.8 billion is stolen from a bank truck, and then 600 kg of gold from an airport, with the thief having impersonated Baek. The following day, he receives a package of the stolen money from the thief, who identifies himself as Ahn Hyeon-min. Baek pursues Ahn, only to discover that he is being used as a pawn in a greater scheme of revenge.

Cast 
 Han Suk-kyu as Baek Seong-chan
 Cha Seung-won as Ahn Hyeon-min
 Song Yeong-chang as Kim Hyeon-tae
 Lee Byung-joon as Antonio
 Jung In-gi as Hwang Min-cheol
 Kim Ji-seok as Song Yoo-gon
 Son Byeong-wook as Kim Do-soo
 Im Sung-kyu as Cha Yeong-jae
 Lee Jae-goo as Detective Park
 Kim Yoon-tae as Detective Kim

Production 
The first half of Eye for an Eye was directed by Ahn Gwon-tae, with the rest completed by Kwak Kyung-taek. Filming took place over a period of seven months on location in Seoul, Jeju Island and Busan, and wrapped on 13 January 2008.

Release 
Eye for an Eye was released in South Korea on 30 July 2008, and on its opening weekend was ranked third at the box office with 590,494 admissions.

References

External links 
  
 
 
 

2008 films
2000s Korean-language films
2008 action thriller films
2000s crime action films
2008 crime thriller films
Films about organized crime in South Korea
South Korean neo-noir films
Police detective films
South Korean crime action films
South Korean crime thriller films
South Korean action thriller films
Films directed by Kwak Kyung-taek
Lotte Entertainment films
2000s South Korean films